The 1947–48 season was Aberdeen's 36th season in the top flight of Scottish football and their 37th season competed in the Scottish League Division One, Scottish League Cup, and the Scottish Cup.

Results

Division A

Final standings

Scottish League Cup

Group 1

Group 1 final table

Knockout stage

Scottish Cup

References

AFC Heritage Trust

Aberdeen F.C. seasons
Aber